Kaye Firth is a New Zealand Paralympian who competed in athletics and swimming. At the 1980 Summer Paralympics, she won a gold medal in the Pentathlon B.

References

External links 
 
 

Living people
Year of birth missing (living people)
Paralympic athletes of New Zealand
Paralympic swimmers of New Zealand
Athletes (track and field) at the 1980 Summer Paralympics
Swimmers at the 1980 Summer Paralympics
Paralympic gold medalists for New Zealand
Medalists at the 1980 Summer Paralympics
Paralympic medalists in athletics (track and field)
New Zealand female freestyle swimmers
New Zealand pentathletes
20th-century New Zealand women